Onslunda is a locality situated in Tomelilla Municipality, Skåne County, Sweden with 490 inhabitants in 2010. It lies around 10 km north-east of Tomelilla.

Population

References

See also 
 

Populated places in Tomelilla Municipality
Populated places in Skåne County